Binoche is an Occitan French last name. Notable people with the surname include:

 Léon Binoche (1878–1962), French international rugby union player
 Juliette Binoche (born 1964), French Academy Award-winning actress

Occitan-language surnames